ThrustSSC, Thrust SSC or Thrust SuperSonic Car is a British jet car developed by Richard Noble, Glynne Bowsher, Ron Ayers, and Jeremy Bliss.

Both Thrust SSC and Thrust2 are displayed at the Coventry Transport Museum in Coventry, England. As part of the Museum's redevelopment project, both cars were relocated by specialist haulier from their position in the Museum's Spirit of Speed Gallery to the new Biffa Award Land Speed Record Gallery which opened in 2015.

It had a reported thrust of 223 kN (approximately 50,000 pounds force) at some operating condition. Jet engines are not designed to operate at peak airspeed while still in ground effect; a proper estimate would need to take this into account.

Details
The car was driven by Royal Air Force fighter pilot Wing Commander Andy Green in the Black Rock Desert in the state of Nevada. It was powered by two afterburning Rolls-Royce Spey turbofan engines, as used in the British version of the F-4 Phantom II jet fighter. The twin engines developed a net thrust of 223 kN (50,000 lbf) at the measured record speed of 341 metres per second, burning around 18 litres/second (4.0 Imperial gallons/s or 4.8 US gallons/s) of fuel. The thermal power released by burning 18 litres/second of aviation fuel is approximately 630 MW which means the vehicle was operating at around 12% efficiency at its record speed, efficiency being the useful working power (76 MW) divided by the thermal power (630 MW).

The record run in October 1997 was preceded by extensive test runs of the vehicle in autumn 1996 and spring 1997 in the Al-Jafr desert (located in Ma'an Governorate) in Jordan, a location unknown before for its capabilities as a test range for high speed land vehicles.

After the record was set, the World Motor Sport Council released the following message: 
The World Motor Sport Council homologated the new world land speed records set by the team ThrustSSC of Richard Noble, driver Andy Green, on 15 October 1997 at Black Rock Desert, Nevada (USA). This is the first time in history that a land vehicle has exceeded the speed of sound. The new records are as follows:
Flying mile     
Flying kilometre 
In setting the record, the sound barrier was broken in both the north and south runs.
Paris, 11 November 1997.

The complete run history is available.

Legacy
The date of Andy Green's record came exactly a half century and one day after Chuck Yeager broke the sound barrier in Earth's atmosphere, with the Bell X-1 research rocket plane on 14 October 1947.

Both Thrust SSC and Thrust2 are displayed at the Coventry Transport Museum in Coventry, England. Visitors can ride a 4D motion simulator depicting a computer-generated animation of the record-breaking run from the perspective of Green.

Several teams are competing to break the record, including the Bloodhound LSR project, launched in 2008, and the North American Eagle Project, launched in 2004.

Richard NobleOrange-Intel dispute 
In June 2012, a television advertisement for the Orange San Diego mobile phone, containing an Intel processor, was broadcast on British television and featured a fast car in computer generated imagery. Richard Noble claimed that the car was a representation of Thrust SSC and thus these companies had used his intellectual property without permission, putting the future of the Bloodhound LSR project in doubt. The Advertising Standards Authority rejected the Bloodhound team's complaint, claiming that intellectual property disputes were not in its remit. According to BBC News technology correspondent Rory Cellan-Jones, Intel and Orange responded that their production team had researched different styles of "superfast vehicles" and developed their own Orange-branded land speed car, and that the advertisement and phone were not connected to Noble or Bloodhound LSR.

See also 
 Air speed record
 Budweiser Rocket
 List of vehicle speed records
 RAF High Speed Flight 
 Rocket car
Bloodhound SSC

Notes

References
 Richard Noble: Thrust: The Remarkable Story of One Man's Quest for Speed, Hardcover: Partridge, 1998, ; Paperback: Bantam, 1999,

External links
 
Official Thrust SSC website (no longer being updated)
Richard Noble
Coventry Transport Museum where Thrust SSC is on display
Photo-Diary by John Coppinger – including the aerial photo by Richard Meredith-Hardy showing the shock wave as Thrust SSC narrowly exceeds the speed of sound
Thrust SSC the car and the run
Thrust SSC Photos Pictures from Blackrock, Nevada – 15 October 1997
 Speed Record Club – The Speed Record Club seeks to promote an informed and educated enthusiast identity, reporting accurately and impartially to the best of its ability on record-breaking engineering, events, attempts and history.

Jet land speed record cars
1997 in science
1997 in the United States
Black Rock Desert
Collection of the Coventry Transport Museum
1997 in sports in Nevada
Streamliner cars